Tamara Cardoso (born 19 March 1993) is a Luxembourger footballer who plays as a goalkeeper and has appeared for the Luxembourg women's national team.

Career
Cardoso has been capped for the Luxembourg national team, appearing for the team during the 2019 FIFA Women's World Cup qualifying cycle.

References

External links
 
 
 

1993 births
Living people
Luxembourgian women's footballers
Luxembourg women's international footballers
Women's association football goalkeepers
Luxembourgian people of Portuguese descent